The Jamestown Bridge (usually referred to as the Old Jamestown Bridge to avoid confusion with its replacement, the Jamestown Verrazzano Bridge) was a cantilever truss bridge that connected Conanicut Island to mainland North Kingstown, Rhode Island, spanning the West passage of Narragansett Bay. The bridge first opened to traffic in 1940, replacing ferry service as the primary connection for the town of Jamestown, situated on Conanicut Island. It was constructed for just over $3 million 1940 USD, which was paid for by tolls until June 28, 1969. With a total length of 6,892 feet (2,100 m), the Jamestown Bridge was the third longest in Rhode Island at the time of its destruction, ranking behind its replacement, the adjacent 7,350-foot (2,240 m) Jamestown Verrazzano Bridge, and the 11,248-foot (3,428 m) Claiborne Pell Newport Bridge connecting Conanicut Island to Aquidneck Island and Newport. The Jamestown Bridge was closed to vehicular traffic on October 8, 1992, and its main span was destroyed through a controlled demolition on April 18, 2006.

History 
Navigating around Narragansett Bay had proved troublesome since the colonial era, the first ferry operation began in 1675 introduced an alternate to the long route around Providence, Rhode Island. Steam service in the West Passage began in 1888 and reduced travel times, but subject to weather conditions. In 1920, the first plans for the Jamestown Bridge began and it was stimulated by the Newport Ferry Company's financial troubles. In 1934, during the Great Depression, the State of Rhode Island sought funding from the United States federal government to construct bridges over both the West Passage and East Passage of the bay. The plans were well-supported and passed the Rhode Island House of Representatives by a 96-to-1 vote, and were approved by President Franklin Roosevelt. The minor opposition to the bridge's construction was quelled after the 1938 New England hurricane destroyed the ferry docks and one of the ferryboats on September 21, 1938, stopping ferry service.

The bridge was designed by Parsons, Klapp, Brinckerhoff and Douglass and called for a  bridge with 69 spans with a total cost of $3 million. The bridge was delayed by two months, but was completed for better than $100,000 under budget. A crew of nearly 200 constructed the bridge and the work was completed without a single fatality. This claim however is contested as a fatality took place during the construction of the coffer dams on September 18, 1939. On July 27, 1940, the bridge opened for traffic and a 90 cent toll was charged on the North Kingstown side. The toll would later be reduced to 35 cents and 25 cents before being removed in 1969, following the completion of the Newport (Pell) Bridge. A formal dedication of the bridge commenced on the weekend of August 2 through August 4, 1940, with a military marine parade on the final day.

Structure
The bridge consisted of 69 spans with a large continuous cantilever Warren truss centerpiece.  The 600 ft (183 m) main span was 135 ft (41 m) above the western portion of the Narragansett Bay. The bridge was long thought to be a danger to motorists, consisting of only two undivided lanes, and during the summer months, the eastbound lane was usually at a standstill due to vacationers traveling to Newport via the main route from the mainland. Its steep climb proved challenging for some vehicles and with no passing lanes or shoulders, hazardous conditions resulted when stalled vehicles were on the bridge. The roadway deck through the cantilevered span was an open steel-grid deck, similar to that of the Castleton Bridge just south of Albany, New York, or the now-demolished Sikorsky Bridge on the Merritt Parkway in Connecticut.  The deck proved to be extremely slippery when wet. After the bridge began to show structural problems with age, RIDOT began construction of the Jamestown-Verrazano Bridge in 1985.  The new bridge, which opened on October 17, 1992, includes four divided lanes of traffic with shoulders.

Service 

Head-on collisions on the  undivided bridge were reported to be common, and the steel grid pavement was noted as "treacherous" when wet.

Demolition

The United States Coast Guard had long declared the Jamestown Bridge to be a navigation hazard and requested that the state of Rhode Island dismantle the eastern two thirds of it.  The Sierra Club, an environmental organization, suggested to instead turn the bridge into a bike route and walkway. However, the aging structure proved to be in far worse condition than previously thought, prompting officials to go ahead with removing the entire structure.

On April 18, 2006, the main span of the Jamestown Bridge was brought down by Department of Transportation employee Wilfred Hernandez, using 75 pounds of RDX explosives and 350 shaped charges. TNT charges were later used to remove the concrete piers. On May 18, 2006, crews imploded the trusses that once carried the side spans. Throughout mid-2006, workers removed the remaining support piers and low-level approach spans west of the main channel. The extreme western portion of the bridge was not demolished with the remains of the bridge during 2006, as officials planned to renovate and convert it into a fishing pier, but ultimately it was removed in 2010 when renovation and cleanup proved too costly. That last part was then demolished in the same year. The total cost for removal of the Jamestown Bridge was US$22 million.  The demolished steel superstructure was floated away for recycling, while concrete from the bridge piers was used to create artificial reefs below the mouth of Narragansett Bay.

References

External links
 Art In Ruins: Jamestown Bridge
 Video on YouTube

Road bridges in Rhode Island
Demolished bridges in the United States
Narragansett Bay
Bridges in Newport County, Rhode Island
Bridges in Washington County, Rhode Island
Former road bridges in the United States
Former toll bridges in Rhode Island
Cantilever bridges in the United States
Buildings and structures in North Kingstown, Rhode Island
Buildings and structures in Jamestown, Rhode Island
1940 establishments in Rhode Island
2006 disestablishments in Rhode Island
Bridges completed in 1940
Buildings and structures demolished in 2006
Metal bridges in the United States
Warren truss bridges in the United States